Darlene Yee-Melichar is professor and coordinator of the gerontology program at San Francisco State University where she also serves as Director of Long-Term Care Administration. She is a member on both the SF State and CSU Academic Senates.

Early career 

Yee-Melichar was born in 1958 and graduated with a bachelor’s degree in Biological Sciences from Barnard College. She received a master's degree in gerontology from the College of New Rochelle and a second master's degree in health education from Teachers College of Columbia University. Yee-Melichar received a doctoral degree in Health Education and post-doctoral training in Computer Management Systems from Teachers College of Columbia University. She augmented her academic training as a Certified Health Education Specialist.

Yee-Melichar worked as an assistant professor of Health Education and Gerontology at York College, CUNY (The City University of New York) from August 1985 to July 1988. She became an associate professor of Health Promotion and Gerontology at the University of Texas Medical Branch at Galveston from August 1988 to July 1990. As of August 1990, Yee-Melichar works as a full professor of Gerontology at San Francisco State University.

Scholarship 

Yee-Melichar is recognized as an international authority on two areas of specialization in gerontology: healthy aging, and long-term care administration.

Her scholarship focuses on these two important areas of expertise. Yee-Melichar’s research interests in healthy aging, long-term care administration, minority women’s health, and safety research and education are reflected in 4 books, 107 journal articles, book chapters, book reviews, technical reports, and numerous professional and scholarly presentations. She is a Charter Fellow of the Association for Gerontology in Higher Education, Fellow of the Gerontological Society of America, Fellow of the AAHPERD Research Consortium, and Full Member of Sigma Xi, the national research society.

Gerontologist and long-term care advocate 
Yee-Melichar was active on the NIH Advisory Committee for Research on Women's Health, NIH Review Committee for Research Enhancement Awards Program, and AHRQ special emphasis panels on "Translating Research into Practice" and "Health Research Dissemination." 
She chaired the U.S. DHHS-OWH Minority Women’s Health Panel of Experts; contributed to the U.S. DHHS-Centers for Medicare & Medicaid Services' Advisory Panel on Outreach and Education, and U.S. DHHS-OWH Region IX Women’s Health Advisory Council; and is active on the OMH-NPA Regional Health Equity Council for Region IX (RHEC IX), and IAGG 2017 World Congress on Gerontology Local Arrangements Committee

Yee-Melichar has served on the Editorial Boards of numerous journals including the Journal of Gerontological Social Work and Journal of Health Education; and serves on the Board of Directors for the California Advocates for Nursing Home Reform and as President of SF State’s Chapter of Sigma Xi, the national research society.

Publications 
In addition to 107 journal articles, book chapters, book reviews and technical reports, Yee-Melichar co-authored and co-edited four textbooks:
Long-Term Care Administration and Management Effective Practices and Quality Programs in Eldercare
Assisted Living Administration & Management: Effective Practices and Model Programs in Elder Care
Minority Women’s Health: Current Issues in Research, Education and Practice
Aging in Contemporary Society: Translating Research Into Practice

Select awards and honors 

Yee-Melichar is the recipient of many awards and honors for teaching excellence and service contributions to the campus, community, and profession.

Appointed as Co-Chair of the IAGG 2017 World Congress on Gerontology Local Arrangements Committee
Appointed as Co-Chair of the U.S. DHHS-OMH Region IX Regional Health Equity Council, Fall 2016
Appointed as Co-Chair of the Gerontological Society of America (GSA) Program Committee for the 2015 Annual Scientific Conference, Fall 2013
Appointed as Member of the Region IX Women’s Health Advisory Council, Fall 2011
Community Service Learning Award from San Francisco State University, April 2003
Distinguished Alumni Award from Teachers College, Columbia University, November 2001
Appointed as Member of the National Institutes of Health (NIH) Advisory Committee for Research on Women’s Health, Fall 1999
Appointed as Member of the U.S. Department of Health & Human Services– Office on Women’s Health (DHHS-OWH) Minority Women's Health Panel of Experts, Fall 1998
Appointed as Member of the Agency for Healthcare Research & Quality (AHRQ) emphasis panels on Translating Research Into Practice and Health Research Dissemination Implementation, Fall 1998
Elected as Charter Fellow, Association of Gerontology in Higher Education, 1997
Appointed as Member of the NIH Task Force for the Office of Research on Women’s Health, 1996
Appointed as Member of the NIH Task Force for the Office for Protection from Research Risks, 1996
Elected as Fellow, Social Research, Policy and Practice Section, The Gerontological Society of America, 1994

References

External links 

Darlene Yee Sf State Faculty
Gerontology Program

American gerontologists
1958 births
Educators from New York City
American women educators
San Francisco State University faculty
Barnard College alumni
College of New Rochelle alumni
Teachers College, Columbia University alumni
Living people
21st-century American women